Fuyang railway station is a railway station in Fuyang District, Hangzhou, Zhejiang, China. It opened on 25 December 2018 along with the Hangzhou–Huangshan intercity railway.

Construction of the station building started in January 2018.

See also 
 Fuyang West railway station (Zhejiang)

References 

Railway stations in Zhejiang
Railway stations in China opened in 2018